The Central District of Farsan County is in Chaharmahal and Bakhtiari province, Iran. At the 2006 census, its population was 90,111 in 19,878 households. The following census in 2011 counted 50,005 people in 12,935 households. At the latest census in 2016, the district had 41,493 inhabitants living in 11,492 households.

References 

Farsan County

Districts of Chaharmahal and Bakhtiari Province

Populated places in Chaharmahal and Bakhtiari Province

Populated places in Farsan County